Ruma Bazar is a village in Bandarban District in the Chittagong Division of southeastern Bangladesh.

Gallery

References

Populated places in Bandarban District